Empress Tunggiya may refer to:

Empress Xiaokangzhang (1640–1663), concubine of the Shunzhi Emperor who became an empress dowager
Empress Xiaoyiren (died 1689), wife of the Kangxi Emperor
Empress Xiaoshencheng (1792–1833), wife of the Daoguang Emperor

Tunggiya